Ryan McGrath Koenig (born October 4, 1985 in St. Louis, Missouri, United States) is an American roots musician.

Koenig's early career began in 2004 as singer and guitarist for garage-rock band The Vultures.  He later formed acoustic blues group The Rum Drum Ramblers with Mat Wilson and Joey Glynn.  Koenig and Glynn joined up with Pokey LaFarge in 2008 and began touring extensively as Pokey LaFarge and the South City Three.  The band, later shortened to Pokey LaFarge, toured the United States, Canada, Europe, Asia, Australia, and New Zealand, and made appearances on The Late Show with David Letterman, The Grand Ole Opry, The Marty Stuart Show, The Conan O'Brien Show, and in the motion picture The Lone Ranger, and many others.

Ryan Koenig's other current acts include duo with wife Kellie Everett, Southwest Watson Sweethearts, in addition to Rum Drum Ramblers, New Missouri Fox Hunters, Ryan Koenig and the Goldenrods, and appears as a guest with The Hooten Hallers, Jack Grelle, Lavender Country, and many others.  His debut solo record Two Different Worlds was released by Big Muddy Records on October 13, 2017. On December 5, 2017, Koenig was seriously injured after being struck by a vehicle while walking during a tour stop in Charleston, South Carolina. Following the accident, Koenig ceased touring with the Pokey LaFarge band.

Koenig released a live solo recording entitled The Focal Point Recordings Vol 1 on December 29, 2018.  He followed that release with Ryan Koenig and The Goldenrods, The Focal Point Recordings Vol 2, in December 2019.

Appearances
Pokey LaFarge and the South City Three appeared in an NPR Tiny Desk Concert series in 2011.
 Pokey and the members of the South City Three played on "I Guess I Should Go To Sleep", a track from Jack White's album Blunderbuss released on April 24, 2012.

Discography

Honors, distinctions, and awards
2011 Independent Music Awards: Riverboat Soul – Best Americana Album
2012 Independent Music Awards: Middle of Everywhere – Best Americana Album
2015 Something In The Water was named one of Peter Jones’ Best Folk Albums of 2015 in the Folk Department of WTJU, University of Virginia radio station.
2018 Named as an honoree of The Riverfront Times' STL 77

References

1985 births
Living people
American blues harmonica players
21st-century American singers
21st-century American male singers
Country musicians from Missouri
Musicians from St. Louis
Singer-songwriters from Missouri
American male singer-songwriters
American country singer-songwriters
Third Man Records artists
Rounder Records artists